Asikhmovanov or Osikhmovani was a Russo-Georgian noble family, descending from the Georgian petite noble (aznauri) Tulashvili (თულაშვილი; in Russian Tulaev, Тулаев) who went to Russia in the suite of King Vakhtang VI of Kartli in 1724. He elevated them to the princely dignity (tavadi) and they later took the name of Osikhmovani (Asikhmovanov). Prince Iotam Tulaev was granted an estate in Little Russia in 1742. Several members of the family served in the Imperial Russian army and are last heard of in 1843.

References 

Noble families of Georgia (country)
Russian noble families